A list of films produced in Brunei from the earliest film to present. Films are listed by year of release.

1968-2017

References

Brunei